Fox Creek is a stream in Harrison County, Missouri. It is a tributary of Sugar Creek.

The coordinates of the stream source are:  .
The coordinates of the stream mouth  are:  .

Fox Creek was named for the foxes which once were frequent in the area.

See also
List of rivers of Missouri

References

Rivers of Harrison County, Missouri
Rivers of Missouri